Laurel Hill State Park is a  Pennsylvania state park in Jefferson and Middlecreek Townships, Somerset County, Pennsylvania in the United States. Laurel Hill Lake is a  man-made lake with a dam that was constructed during the Great Depression by the young men of CCC camps SP-8-PA and SP-15-PA.

History

The lumber era
The lumber boom that swept through the hills and forests of Pennsylvania did not reach Laurel Hill Valley until 1886. At this time the area was one of the last in Pennsylvania that had not been touched by the lumbermen. The mountains were stripped of the old-growth forests of hemlock and white pine. The lumbermen took the logs to the sawmill where they were cut into lumber. Smaller logs were used to reinforce the mine shafts of the many coal mines throughout southwestern Pennsylvania and West Virginia. The bark of the hemlock tree was used as a source of tannin at the tanneries of the area. The only thing the lumbermen left behind was the treetops. These tree tops were left to dry. The passing steam locomotives on the railroads would ignite this dry brush causing massive wildfires that swept through the mountains and valleys. The Laurel Hill area was left to waste. The forests struggled to regrow in the wake of the wildfire. The hills began to erode. The streams were dying and wildlife was scarcely found.

The Laurel Hill RDA was listed on the National Register of Historic Places in 1987, as a national historic district. The district includes 198 contributing buildings and 4 contributing structures.

The forests come back

The area in and surrounding Laurel Hill State Park no longer resembles the desolate wasteland left behind the lumbermen. It is now a thriving second growth forest that is home to a wide variety of wildlife. The efforts of the men of the Works Progress Administration and Civilian Conservation Corps during the Great Depression helped to bring about the revitalization of the forests.

The Federal Emergency Relief Administration bought the stripped forest land in the Laurel Hill Area in 1935 as part of President Franklin D. Roosevelt's New Deal during the Great Depression. Under the direction of the National Park Service and the U.S. Army the men working for the WPA and CCC began the process of building what was to become Laurel Hill State Park on July 1, 1935 at CCC camps SP-8-PA and SP-16-PA. These men cleared the streams and forests tangled brush, they built bridges on state roads, cleared paths in the forests, planted trees and built many of the facilities used today at Laurel Hill State Park. Their work can be seen today at the park with the dam on Laurel Hill Lake and the large group camping facilities of the park.

The United States Department of the Interior transferred ownership of the area to the Commonwealth of Pennsylvania in 1945 and Laurel Hill State Park was officially opened.

Recreation

The Hemlock Trail

The only virgin trees left untouched were on steep ground above the Laurel Hill Creek that was apparently too difficult for the loggers to reach. The Hemlock Trail now winds through this ancient stand of trees, and is accessible from one end at the sharp bend on Buck Run Road, and from the other at the head of the lake.

Hunting
The most common game species are rabbits, pheasant, raccoon, squirrels, turkey and white-tailed deer. The hunting of groundhogs is prohibited. Hunters are expected to follow the rules and regulations of the Pennsylvania Game Commission. Each September Laurel Hill State Park is open for Canada goose hunting. The goose hunt is part of a statewide effort to limit the "resident goose" population. Biologists have attributed high fecal coliform counts at some parks to geese droppings. The fecal matter pollutes the water and beaches of the parks.

Fishing and boating

Laurel Hill Creek and Jones Mill Run are stocked with trout and also have a good population of native brook trout.  Laurel Hill Lake is a fishery for trout, catfish, sunfish, perch, crappie, bluegill, and bass.

Gasoline powered boats are prohibited on Laurel Hill Lake. Non powered and electric powered boats must have current registration with any state.

Swimming
The beach at Laurel Hill State Park is open daily from late May until the middle of September. The beach opens at 8:00 am and closes at sunset.

Picnics

Laurel Hill State Park has three picnic areas. Picnic area # 1 has a playground, a ballfield and horseshoe pits. Picnic area # 3 is near the beach and also has a playground. Picnic area # 4 is near the boat launch and mooring area. There is no picnic area # 2.

Winter recreation
Laurel Hill Lake is open for ice fishing and ice boating. Laurel Hill State Park has  of trails open to cross-country skiing.

Staying overnight
Laurel Hill State Park has several options for visitors that are interested in spending the night or several nights at the park.

Campground
The campground has 262 sites for tent or trailer camping. 149 of these sites have an electrical connections. The campground has modern washhouses with flush toilets, showers, drinking water, and two sanitary dump stations. There is one walled tent that is available for rent, which sleeps up to six people and has a refrigerator and bunk beds.

Cottages
There are eight cottages available to rent at Laurel Hill State Park. Each cottage has electric lights, outlets, and electric heater. They sleep up to five people and have wooden floors, glass windows and a screened-in porch. The yard areas have a picnic table and a fire ring.

Group tenting
There is a large area for organized group tenting that is open year-round. Groups are expected to follow the following rules and regulations.
 1. All groups must submit a roster to the park office.
 2. Fires are to be built in the designated fire areas only.
 3. Standing timber must not be cut.
 4. Trailers are not permitted in the group tenting area.

Cabins (Group camping)
The cabins built and used by the CCC are still used today by large, non-profit groups. The six group cabin areas are open from mid-April until mid-October. These camping facilities each have a centrally located shower house with flush toilets and large dining hall with kitchen.

Laurel Hill Lodge
Laurel Hill Lodge is a modern two-story lodge with a large fireplace and cathedral ceilings. It has a private deck that overlooks the park and Laurel Mountain. The lodge is equipped for winter recreation. It has racks for skis and snowboards and for drying gloves and boots. There are five bedrooms that can sleep up to 14 people. There are 3 bathrooms, 1.5 kitchens, a recreation room and laundry facilities.

Boy Scout camps

There are two Boy Scout camps run by Westmoreland-Fayette Council within the state park: Camp Conestoga and Camp Buck Run.

Nearby state parks
The following state parks are within  of Laurel Hill State Park:
Casselman River State Park (Maryland)
Keystone State Park (Westmoreland County)
Kooser State Park (Somerset County)
Laurel Mountain State Park (Westmoreland County)
Laurel Ridge State Park (Cambria, Fayette, Somerset, and Westmoreland counties)
Laurel Summit State Park (Westmoreland County)
Linn Run State Park (Westmoreland County)
New Germany State Park (Maryland)
Ohiopyle State Park (Fayette County)

References

External links

  

State parks of Pennsylvania
Parks in Somerset County, Pennsylvania
Laurel Highlands
Historic districts in Somerset County, Pennsylvania
Protected areas established in 1945
Civilian Conservation Corps in Pennsylvania
Works Progress Administration in Pennsylvania
Historic districts on the National Register of Historic Places in Pennsylvania
National Register of Historic Places in Somerset County, Pennsylvania
Protected areas of Somerset County, Pennsylvania